Wynnstay is a country house within an important landscaped park 1.3 km (0.75 miles) south-east of Ruabon, near Wrexham, Wales. Wynnstay, previously Watstay, is a famous estate and the family seat of the Wynns. The house was sold in 1948 and is under a private ownership as of 2020. The estate remains under the ownership of the Williams-Wynn family.

During the 17th century, Sir John Wynn, 5th Baronet, inherited the Watstay Estate through his marriage to Jane Evans (daughter of Eyton Evans of Watstay), and renamed it the Wynnstay Estate. The gardens were laid out by Capability Brown. Wynnstay was Brown's largest commission in Wales, work beginning in 1774 and completed in 1784, a year after his death. He replaced the older formal gardens with lawns which swept right up to the house overlooking the lake.

Famous occupants of the house and estate included Sir Watkin Williams-Wynn, 4th Baronet. During the 19th century, Princess Victoria stayed there with her mother, the Duchess of Kent.

In 1858 Wynnstay was destroyed by fire and was rebuilt on the same site.

After the house was vacated by the Williams-Wynn family in the mid-20th century, in favour of the nearby Plas Belan on the Wynnstay estate, it was bought by Lindisfarne College. When the school closed due to bankruptcy, the building was converted to flats and several private houses.

The house is a Grade II* listed building. The gardens underwent a process of refurbishment, which was completed by 2016. The gardens are listed as Grade I in the Cadw/ICOMOS Register of Parks and Gardens of Special Historic Interest in Wales.

References

External links
Transcript of information from Picturesque Views of Seats of The Noblemen and Gentlemen of Great Britain and Ireland edited by F. O. Morris (published c.1880) 
1860 – Wynnstay Hall, Ruabon, Wales

Ruabon
Houses in Wrexham
Grade II* listed buildings in Wrexham County Borough
Country houses in Wales
Gardens by Capability Brown
Registered historic parks and gardens in Wrexham County Borough
Grade II* listed houses in Wales